Lezhë County is one of the 12 counties of Albania. The population as of 2021 was 120,678, in an area of 1620 km². Its capital is the city Lezhë.

Administrative divisions
Until 2000, Lezhë County was subdivided into three districts: Kurbin, Lezhë, and Mirditë. Since the 2015 local government reform, the county consists of the following 3 municipalities: Kurbin, Lezhë and Mirditë. Before 2015, it consisted of the following 21 municipalities:

 Balldren i Ri
 Blinisht
 Dajç
 Fan
 Fushë-Kuqë
 Kaçinar
 Kallmet
 Kolsh
 Kthellë
 Laç
 Lezhë
 Mamurras
 Milot 
 Orosh
 Rrëshen
 Rubik
 Selitë
 Shëngjin
 Shënkoll
 Ungrej
 Zejmen

The municipalities consist of about 175 towns and villages in total. See Villages of Lezhë County for a structured list.

Demographics 
According to the last national census from 2011 this county has 134,027 inhabitants. Ethnic groups in the county include:
Albanians = 116,469 (86.90%)
Greeks = 41 (0.03%)
Macedonians = 9 (0.01%)
Montenegrins = 8 (0.01%)
Aromanians = 15 (0.01%)
Romani = 187 (0.14%)
Egyptians = 240 (0.18%)
others = 18 (0.01%)
no answer = 17,040 (12.71%)

References

External links

Regional Council of Lezha
 Lezha Online News
  Lezha Travel & Tourism
 Shengjini Travel & Tourism
 Mirdita Tourism Portal

 
Counties of Albania